Nicolas de Joinville was a French knight who served as bailli of the Principality of Achaea for Prince John of Gravina from 1323, until the Prince's arrival in Achaea in January 1325. He was the great-grandson of the chronicler Jean de Joinville. Joinville was an able man, and was sent to Achaea as part of John of Gravina's preparations for an—ultimately unsuccessful—campaign against the Byzantine Empire.

References

Sources
 
 

14th-century French people
Baillis of the Principality of Achaea
14th-century people from the Principality of Achaea